In science, adversarial collaboration is a term used when two or more scientists with opposing views work together. This can take the form of a scientific experiment conducted by two groups of experimenters with competing hypotheses, with the aim of constructing and implementing an experimental design in a way that satisfies both groups that there are no obvious biases or weaknesses in the experimental design. Adversarial collaboration can involve a neutral moderator and lead to a co-designed experiment and joint publishing of findings in order to resolve differences.

Adversarial collaboration has been recommended by Daniel Kahneman and others as a way of reducing the distorting impact of cognitive-motivational biases on human reasoning and resolving contentious issues in fringe science. It has also been recommended as a potential solution for improving academic commentaries.

Philip Tetlock and Gregory Mitchell have discussed it in various articles.  They argue:

References

External links 
 The Adversarial Collaboration Project at UPenn studies and supports researchers with differing views
 AI Magazine's AI Bookies column supports an adversarial approach to AI Research
Lesswrong Has examples of adversarial collaboration

Design of experiments
Skepticism